Ouji Talar (also Romanized as Oujī Tālār; also known as Ojī Tālār and Ūchītālār) is a village in Balatajan Rural District, in the Central District of Qaem Shahr County, Mazandaran Province, Iran. At the 2006 census, its population was 264, in 79 families.

References 

Populated places in Qaem Shahr County